Scott Metcalfe (born January 6, 1967) is a Canadian former professional ice hockey player, who played 19 games in the National Hockey League (NHL).

Playing career
Metcalfe was born in Toronto, Ontario. He began his junior career playing with the Kingston Canadians of the Ontario Hockey League (OHL) from 1983 to 1986, playing in 192 games, scoring 213 points (88 goals and 125 assists), and added 3 goals and 6 assists in 10 playoff games, before being traded to the Windsor Spitfires for the 1986–87 season, for whom he played 57 games, with 25 goals and 57 assists, plus 5 goals and 5 assists in 13 playoff games. He also played for Team Canada at the 1987 World Junior Ice Hockey Championships, scoring 7 points (2 goals, 5 assists) in six games. Metcalfe was drafted by the Edmonton Oilers with their first pick, 20th overall in the 1985 NHL Entry Draft.

Metcalfe began the 1987–88 season with the Nova Scotia Oilers of the American Hockey League (AHL), where he had 28 points (9G-19A) in 43 games, and played 2 games with Edmonton, scoring no points, before being traded to the Buffalo Sabres, along with the Oilers' ninth-round draft pick in the 1989 NHL Entry Draft, for Steve Dykstra and the Sabres' seventh-round pick in the 1989 NHL Draft, on February 11, 1988. Metcalfe spent the majority of his time in the Sabres system with the Rochester Americans of the AHL, scoring 15 points (2G-13A) in 22 games, and he played a single game with the Sabres, picking up his first NHL point, an assist.  He chipped in with 4 points (1G-3A) in 7 playoff games with Rochester.

Metcalfe spent most of the 1988–89 season with Rochester, picking up 51 points (20G-31A) in 60 games, along with 241 penalty minutes, and he played 9 games in Buffalo, earning 2 points (1G-1A). He once again split his playing time between Rochester and Buffalo in 1989–90, scoring 29 points (12G-17A) in 43 games in Rochester, and no points in 7 games with the Sabres. Metcalfe recorded an assist in 2 playoff games with Rochester. He spent the entire 1990–91 season with the Americans, scoring 39 points (17G-22A) in 69 games, and had 5 points (4G-1A) in 14 post-season games.

In 1991–92, Metcalfe played for EHC Dynamo Berlin in Germany, picking up 35 points (19G-16A) in 25 games. He played the 1992–93 season with ES Weißwasser, also in Germany, scoring 7 points (4G-3A) in 8 games, before moving to Eisbären Berlin for the rest of the season, with 25 points (8G-17A) in 27 games.  Metcalfe would get 4 points (2G-2A) in 4 playoff games.

He returned to North America in 1993–94 and played for the Knoxville Cherokees of the ECHL, scoring 81 points (25G-56A) in 56 games, and added an assist in 3 playoff games. He also spent 16 games with the Rochester Americans, earning 12 points (5G-7A), and 1 goal in 4 playoff games.

Metcalfe continued playing for the Americans from 1994 to 1998, recording 55 points (19G-36A) in 63 games in 1994–95, and 2 points (1G-1A) in 5 playoff games, then had a 45-point season (21G-24A) in 71 games in 1995–96, and then had his best playoff performance with 14 points (6G-8A) in 19 games. His best season was in 1996–97, registering 70 points (32G-38A) in 80 games, and he added 4 points (1G-3A) in 10 playoff games. Metcalfe's production slipped in 1997–98 to 33 points (9G-24A) in 75 games, and he went pointless in 4 playoff games.

Metcalfe returned to Germany in 1998–99, playing for the Hannover Scorpions of the Deutsche Eishockey Liga (DEL), earning 32 points (11G-21A) in 50 games. He returned to the Scorpions for the 1999–2000 season, picking up 28 points (10G-18) in 61 games. In 2000–01, Metcalfe joined the Sheffield Steelers of the Ice Hockey Superleague in Great Britain, getting 23 points (8G-15A) in 49 games, along with 9 points (7G-2A) in 11 playoff games.

He returned to North America once again in 2001–02, but only played in 3 games with the Adirondack IceHawks of the United Hockey League (UHL), scoring no points, and retired from hockey.

Career statistics

Regular season and playoffs

International

External links

1967 births
Adirondack IceHawks players
Buffalo Sabres players
Canadian ice hockey centres
Edmonton Oilers draft picks
Edmonton Oilers players
Eisbären Berlin players
Hannover Scorpions players
Kingston Canadians players
Knoxville Cherokees players
Living people
National Hockey League first-round draft picks
Nova Scotia Oilers players
Rochester Americans players
Sheffield Steelers players
Ice hockey people from Toronto
Windsor Spitfires players
Canadian expatriate ice hockey players in England
Canadian expatriate ice hockey players in Germany